Juan Francisco Pimentel, 7th Duke of Benavente was a fifteenth-century Castilian noble. His title was a Ducal title going back to January 1473 conferred by king Henry IV of Castile, also known as Juan Francisco Alonso Pimentel y Ponce de León (1614 – † 1652), a Knight of the Order of the Golden Fleece in 1648, number 421, 10th Count and 7th Duke of Benavente, 10th Count of Mayorga, 8th Count of Comarca de Luna.

His mother, María Ponce de León,  was a niece of Rodrigo Ponce de León, 4th Duke of Arcos, (1602–1658), Viceroy of Valencia, 1642–1645,  Viceroy of Naples, 1646–1648, a purchaser of Caravaggio paintings while in his Viceroy office in Naples.

Family
He was the eldest son of 6 children of Antonio Alonso Pimentel, 6th Duke of Benavente, deceased 1633 and María Ponce de León, (1572–1618), daughter of Rodrigo Ponce de León, 3rd Duke of Arcos and the niece of the Duke of Arcos Rodrigo Ponce de León, 4th Duke of Arcos.

His first marriage in 1614 was to his cousin, Mencia de Zúñiga y Requesens, daughter of  Luis Fajardo y Requesens, 4th Marquis de los Vélez.

Their eldest male survivor out of 5 males/females, was the 8th Duke and was known sometimes and in some offices as Antonio Alonso Pimentel de Herrera y Zúñiga, married in 1637, first wife deceased in 1654 with issue. He died in 1677. His name was modified to Pimentel de Herrera or Pimentel Herrera because the 5th Duke, Juan Alonso, died in 1621 and his eldest brother, the 4th Duke, Luis Alonso, no issue, died in 1576. They described themselves with the "Pimentel Herrera" or "Pimentel de Herrera" name, to stress their connection with a branch of the powerful and wide Enriquez family. Needless to say, using Luis Alonso, Juan Alonso, or Antonio, caused confusions when describing building contracts within the Duchy.

His second marriage was in 1648, to Antonia de Mendoza y Orense, daughter of Antonio Gómez Manrique de Mendoza, 5th Count of Castrogeriz.

References

Biblioteca del conde de Benavente

1614 births
1652 deaths
107
Counts of Spain
Knights of the Golden Fleece